William Joseph O'Brien (7 September 1882 – 15 June 1953) was an Australian politician.

He was born in Parkes to carrier William O'Brien and Bridget, née O'Sullivan. He worked as a cabinetmaker and in the railways, and was an official in the Furniture Trades' Union, being a delegate to and later president of the Trades and Labor Council. In 1916 he was a foundation member of the Industrial Vigilance Council and a delegate to the Anti-Conscription League, and from 1913 to 1917 he served on the central executive of the Australian Labor Party (vice-president 1916–17). In 1917 he was elected to the New South Wales Legislative Assembly as the member for Annandale, transferring to Murray with the introduction of proportional representation in 1920. O'Brien served until 1925. He died at Leichhardt in 1953.

References

 

1882 births
1953 deaths
People from the Central West (New South Wales)
Members of the New South Wales Legislative Assembly
Australian cabinetmakers
Australian people of Irish descent
Australian Labor Party members of the Parliament of New South Wales
20th-century Australian politicians